The Chief of the Defence Staff ( [CEMA]) is the military head of the Armed Forces of the French Republic, ensuring the commandment of all military operations (under reserve of the particular dispositions relative to nuclear deterrence). They are responsible to the Minister of the Armed Forces and their deputy is the Major General of the Defence Staff. Since the 1950s, the office has been held only by four stars generals (OF–9), either from the Army, the Navy, or the Air and Space Force. The current Chief is General Thierry Burkhard since 22 July 2021.

History

Commander-in-Chief of the Armies 

While non-official, the term Generalissimo or « » was employed since 1914 to designate the individual who in reality was Commander-in-Chief of the armies of the North and North-East « ». The term would be made official in 1915 when Joffre was also given command over the Salonika front (a degree of authority not enjoyed by his successors). The rank and post was successively occupied by three generals during World War I: Joseph Joffre, who occupied the rank and functions from August 1914 without bearing the official title, then Robert Nivelle and Philippe Pétain.

Général Ferdinand Foch was the Assistant Commander-in-Chief of the Northern Zone under Joseph Joffre in autumn 1914; this role later crystallised into command of French Army Group North, a position which Foch held until December 1916. Subsequently, Foch became Supreme Allied Commander on the Western Front with the title Généralissime in 1918 then was designated as « Commandant en Chef des Armées Alliées » (English:Commander-in-Chief of Allied Forces) starting 14 May 1918. Foch was promoted to Marshal of France prior the planning of the offensive that led to the Armistice of 11 November 1918. Following the armistice, Marshal Ferdinand Foch was elevated to the dignity of the Marshal of Great Britain and Poland.

Chief of Staff of National Defence
Toward the end of the Second World War, Charles de Gaulle who was Commander-in-Chief of the Free French Forces was assisted by a Staff of National Defence. It was headed by a Chief of Staff who had authority over all armed forces. This was the first time that a joint staff of the French armed forces was created.

However the Chiefs of the Army, of the Navy and of the Air Force were opposed to this office after the war as they fear they would lose their independence of action. This opposition was eventually hushed up and the position of Chief of Staff of the Armies (under various other names until 1962) was created on 28 April 1948.

Functions

Responsibilities 
The CEMA assists the Minister of the Armed Forces in its capacity attributions to make use of the various required forces and their general organisation. They are consulted on direction to be given to planning and programming work and may be charged by the Minister with any study concerning the armies. The Chief of Staff is responsible for coordinating the requirements of the forces in support of joint services. The CEMA, in virtue of decree dispositions of 15 July 2009, under the authority of the President of the French Republic, the French government, and under the reserve of the particular dispositions relative to nuclear deterrence, is responsible for the use of forces and commandment of all military operations. The CEMA is the military counselor of the government.

They bring together the proposals of the Delegate General of Armaments (DGA), the Chiefs of Staff of each army, and the directors of joint services in the areas of planning and programming. After consulting the DGA on technical and industrial possibilities, they shall report to the Minister on all the work and shall propose to them the measures necessary to ensure their consistency with regard to employment and their accounting with the foreseeable financial resources, as assessed by the Secretary General for Administration (SGA), and present a draft decision.

Their responsibilities consist of:

 The conduct of operations : plans of use, general articulation of forces, distribution of operational means between theatre commanders (over whom he has full authority)
 The joint service organizations and the general organization of the armed forces: oversees the coherence of the armed forces organisation
 The expression of the need in material of human resources of the armed forces, the joint institutions, and the definition of the ensemble format of the armed forces. Planning and programming of military capacities. Oversees in effect of coherence in means of the armed forces and participates to the preparation and various executions of associated military and defence budgets. 
 The preparation and condition assignments of recruiting in the armed forces: is in check of forces aptitude in missions completion and has a permanent right of inspection over these forces. 
 Support of the armed forces: determines the general organizations and objectives, assures the operational maintenance in condition of all equipments and determines the joint needs of various material infrastructures and that of the armed forces while verifying status of operability
 The intelligence assessment of military interest: ensures the general research direction and exploitation of the military intelligence
 International military relations: directs French foreign military missions in foreign theatres, organizes the participation of the armed forces in regards to military cooperations, following international mandated negotiations and represents France at the various military committees of international organizations.

Authority 
The Chief of Staff of the Armies has authority over the:

Chief of Staff of the Army
Chief of Staff of the Air and Space Force
Chief of Staff of the Navy

These four Chiefs constitute the Chiefs of Staff Committee, chaired by the Minister.
The CEMA is assisted by a Major General of the Defence Staff, a senior ranked officer of the French Armed Forces, who will deputize if needed.

Additionally, directly under the CEMA authority are: 

 the General Staff of the Armies (État-Major des Armées, EMA)
 the Inspectorate of the Armies (Inspection des Armées, IDA)
 the superior commanders in the overseas departments, the commanders in foreign areas (COMSUP and COMFOR), the general officers of the defence and security areas (OGZDS) and the departmental military delegates (DMD)  
 Joint service institutions:
 Directorate of Military Intelligence (Direction du Renseignement Militaire, DRM)
 Special Operations Command (Commandement des Opérations Spéciales, COS) 
 Joint Defence Staff of Strength and Training (État-Major Interarmées de Force et d'Entraînement, EMIA-FE)
 Central Directorate of the Health Service of the Armies (Direction Centrale du Service de Santé des Armées, DCSSA)
 Central Directorate of the Fuel Service of the Armies (Direction Centrale du Service des Essences des Armées, DCSEA)
 Joint Directorate of Infrastructure Networks and Information Systems (Direction Interarmées des Réseaux d'Infrastructures et des Systèmes d'Information, DIRISI)
 Central Directorate of the Commissariat Service of the Armies (Direction Centrale du Service du Commissariat des Armées, DCSCA)
 Joint Ammunitions Service (Service Interarmées des Munitions, SIMu)
 Directorate of Superior Military Education (Direction de l'Enseignement Militaire Supérieur, DEMS)

Name of the office 
The office took various names during its history:
 President of the Committee of the Chiefs of the General Staffs of the Armed Forces (1948–1950)
 President of the Committee of the Chiefs of the Combined Staff of the Armed Forces (1950–1953)
 Chief of the General Staff of the Armed Forces (1953–1958)
 Chief of the General Staff of the Armies (1958–1961)
 Chief of the Joint Staff (1961–1962)
 Chief of Staff of the Armies (1962 – )

List of chiefs

Provisional Government

Fourth Republic

Fifth Republic

See also 
Chief of the Military Staff of the President of the Republic
Head of the Prime Minister's military cabinet
Head of the Minister of Defence's military cabinet
Chief of Staff of the French Air and Space Force
Chief of Staff of the French Navy
Chief of Staff of the French Army
Special Operations Command
Directorate General of the National Gendarmerie

References

Notes

External links 
  Official website
 Gallery of the chiefs since 1971 on defense.gouv.fr

Military of France
French military staff
France